The Heracles Papyrus (Sackler Library, University of Oxford, Pap. Oxyrhynchus 2331) is a fragment of a 3rd-century Greek manuscript of a poem about the Labours of Heracles. It contains three unframed colored line drawings of the first of the Labors, the killing of the Nemean lion, set within the columns of cursive text. It was found at Oxyrhynchus (Pap. 2331) and is one of the few surviving scraps of classical literary illustration on papyrus. The fragment measures 235 by 106 mm.

External links

 High resolution image (1264×739 pixels)
 Images of the papyrus from Oxyrhynchus Online
 Images and description of the papyrus from Oxyrhynchus: A City and its Texts, Virtual Exhibition

Literary illuminated manuscripts
3rd-century illuminated manuscripts
2331
Sackler library manuscripts
Heracles